USS N-5 (SS-57) was a N-class coastal defense submarine of the United States Navy.  Her keel was laid down on 10 April 1915 by Lake Torpedo Boat Company in Bridgeport, Connecticut. The N-boats built by Lake had slightly different specifications from the ones built by Seattle Construction and Drydock and are sometimes considered a separate class.

N-5 was launched on 22 March 1917 sponsored by Mrs. George Bevans, and commissioned at New York Navy Yard on 13 June 1918.

Service history
Sailing from New York City on 20 June to New London, Connecticut, for fitting out and thence proceeding to Newport, Rhode Island, to load torpedoes, N-5 began patrols off New England and in Long Island Sound on watch against attacks on coastal shipping by German U-boats. In August and September she deployed under tow by a decoy ship, the sailing vessel . On 7 September, after parting tow from her escort in a heavy sea, she was mistaken by an armed transport for a U-boat and was fired upon. All 15 shells fell short and N-5 was able to proceed on to New London. She continued her patrols until 24 October when she put into New York Navy Yard for repairs, and remained there following the Armistice with Germany until sailing to Philadelphia, Pennsylvania, on 21 February 1919.

Overhauled, the submarine departed Philadelphia on 27 March, arriving New London on 10 April. Remaining in ordinary at the Submarine Base until 10 March 1920, the submarine then operated off the East Coast in training until placed in reserve at New London on 7 June. On 1 October, N-5 sailed to Philadelphia Navy Yard for extensive overhaul lasting until 7 April 1921 when she returned to New London, once again being placed in ordinary. There she remained for the next year, while her main engines were removed for transfer to a newer L-class submarine. Then, towed by tug  she moved to Philadelphia Navy Yard, arriving on 14 April 1922.  N-5 decommissioned on 19 April 1922 and was sold to Joseph G. Hitner of Philadelphia for scrap on 25 September 1922.

References

External links
 

United States N-class submarines
World War I submarines of the United States
Ships built in Bridgeport, Connecticut
1917 ships